The bourbon lancer is a type of cocktail made by mixing bourbon whiskey with Champagne. These are mixed with bitters and served on the rocks.

See also
 List of cocktails

References

Cocktails with bourbon whiskey
Bubbly cocktails
Cocktails with Champagne
Cocktails with bitters
Three-ingredient cocktails